Kannan M. Krishnan is the Campbell Chair Professor of Materials Sciences & Engineering and Adjunct Professor of Physics at the University of Washington, Seattle, Washington.

He was named Fellow of the Institute of Electrical and Electronics Engineers (IEEE) in 2013 for contributions to nano-magnetic technology in medicine.

Education
Ph.D., Materials Science & Engineering (Physics & Mathematics - Minors) UC, Berkeley, 1984
M.S., Materials Science, State University of New York, Stony Brook, 1980
B. Tech., Mechanical Engineering, IIT Kanpur, India, 1978

References 

Living people
Stony Brook University alumni
UC Berkeley College of Engineering alumni
21st-century American engineers
Fellow Members of the IEEE
Year of birth missing (living people)
American electrical engineers